Fritillaria brandegeei, the Greenhorn fritillary, is a plant species endemic to California, USA.

Description
Fritillaria brandegeei is a bulb-forming perennial up to 100 cm tall. Leaves are in 1-2 whorls of 4-8 leaves per node. Flowers are nodding, pinkish purple.

Distribution
It is known from only the Greenhorn Mountains, a subrange of the southern Sierra Nevada, within Kern and Tulare counties.

References

brandegeei
Endemic flora of California
Flora of the Sierra Nevada (United States)
Greenhorn Mountains
Natural history of Kern County, California
Natural history of Tulare County, California
Plants described in 1903
Taxa named by Alice Eastwood